The 2018 Georgian Cup was a single elimination association football tournament which began on 16 April 2018 and ended on 25 November 2018. Chikhura Sachkhere were the defending champions of the tournament after winning the previous season's cup 4–3 in a penalty shootout over Torpedo Kutaisi.

Format
For the 2018 version of the Georgian Cup, the competition was contested between 78 clubs. Matches which were level after regulation proceeded to extra time and then to penalties, when needed, to decide the winning club.

First round
Thirty first round matches were played on 14–16 April 2018.

|}

Second round
Sixteen second round matches were played on 8–9 May 2018.

|}

Third round
Sixteen third round matches were played on 12–14 June 2018.

|}

Fourth round
Eight fourth round matches were played on 19–20 September 2018.

|}

Quarter–finals
The quarter–final matches were played on 3 and 24 October 2018.

|}

Semi–finals
The two semi–final matches were played on 7 November 2018.

|}

Final
The final was played on 25 November 2018 in Angisi Stadium in Batumi at 16.00.

See also 
 2018 Erovnuli Liga

References

External links
 Official site 

Georgian Cup seasons
Georgian Cup
Cup